Betelgeusia is an extinct genus of sea stars in the family Radiasteridae. It was described by Blake and Reid, in 1998, and existed in what is now the Netherlands, Texas, United States, Morocco, and India, during the Middle Jurassic through the Cretaceous period. It contains the species B. brezinai, B. exposita, B. reidi, and B. orientalis.

References

External links
 Betelgeusia at the Paleobiology Database

Fossil taxa described in 1998
Jurassic echinoderms
Prehistoric life of Europe
Middle Jurassic genus first appearances
Cretaceous genus extinctions
Prehistoric starfish genera